kernpura is a Gram panchayat in hajipur,  vaishali district, bihar.

Geography
This panchayat is located at

panchayat office

Nearest City/Town
Hajipur (Distance KM)

Nearest major road highway or river
NH 19 (National highway 19 )

compass

Villages in panchayat
There are  villages in this panchayat

References

Gram panchayats in Bihar
Villages in Vaishali district
Vaishali district
Hajipur